Lilliana M. Owens, S.L. (May 13, 1898 - September 27, 1992) was an American historian, writer, educator and Catholic nun. She was known for her historical writing and her Catholic comic books.

Biography 
Owens was born in St. Paul, Minnesota on May 13, 1898. She attended St. Francis High School in St. Paul, Kansas. She went on to become a Sister of Loretto on December 8, 1917. Owens earned a bachelor's degree from Loretto Heights College and a master's degree from St. Louis University. Later, she received a doctorate in history from the St. Louis University. She worked at the Immaculate Conception High School in East Las Vegas, New Mexico in the 1940s. In the 1950s, she was working as a librarian for Loretto Academy in the Bennett Library. She also worked as an associate editor for Revista Católica.

Owens died at the Loretto Mother House Infirmary in Nerinx, Kentucky on September 27, 1992.

Writing 
Owens began writing Catholic comic books in the 1940s. Her comic, Nerinckx and the Sisters of Loretto at the Foot of the Cross, published by Topix comics in 1947, was successful enough to lead to the production of more comics about the Sisters of Loretto. In 1948, Topix also published her story about the Sisters of Loretto and the Louisville flood of 1937, and also published Loretto, the Monument of Nerinck.

In the early 1950s, Owens worked on a collection of volumes about Catholic scholars in the Southwest United States called "Jesuit Studies--Southwest." The volume on Bishop Anthony J. Schuler was considered by New Mexico Historical Review to be well researched. The book was also lauded by Cardinal Eugène Tisserant.

Owens published Loretto in Missouri in 1965, which is a history of the Sisters of Loretto in the state and was her eleventh historical piece of nonfiction.

Selected Bibliography

References 

Sources:

External links 
 Liliana Owens Papers
 
 Comic in the Catholic Advance (1949)
 The Early Work of the Lorettines in Southeastern Kansas

1898 births
1992 deaths
Sisters of Loretto
Saint Louis University alumni
People from El Paso, Texas
American women writers
Female comics writers
American nuns
People from Las Vegas, New Mexico